Johan-Petter Winsnes (born 15 November 1975) is a retired Norwegian football defender.

He is a second cousin of Fredrik Winsnes. Johan-Petter Winsnes came through the ranks of Rosenborg BK, and played friendly matches in 1995 and 1996, including one against AIK. However, he did not make the squad and joined Skeid in 1997. He went on to Byåsen, Moss and Lillestrøm before finishing his career in Skeid.

References

1975 births
Living people
Footballers from Trondheim
Skeid Fotball players
Byåsen Toppfotball players
Moss FK players
Lillestrøm SK players
Eliteserien players
Norwegian First Division players
Association football defenders
Norwegian footballers